Nicolas Mahut and Édouard Roger-Vasselin were the defending champions, but they withdrew before their first match against Tomislav Brkić and Damir Džumhur.
Jamie Delgado and Jonathan Marray won the final against Yves Allegro and Andreas Beck 7–6(4), 6–2.

Seeds

Draw

Draw

External links
 Main Draw

BH Telecom Indoors - Doubles
2011 Doubles